Jordy José Alcívar Macías (born 5 August 1999) is an Ecuadorean professional footballer who plays as a midfielder for Independiente del Valle.

Club career
Alcívar started his career with LDU Quito, where he was nicknamed "La Bochorna 44" after his video game username.

On 18 October 2021, it was announced that he would join newly-formed Major League Soccer side Charlotte FC in January 2022 on a four-year deal.

He scored his first goal for Charlotte FC on 10 April 2022 against Atlanta United FC.

On 24 November 2022, Alcívar was transferred to Ecuadorian Serie A side Independiente del Valle.

International career
In 2019, he won the U-20 South American Championship, and helped Ecuador come third at the U-20 World Cup in Poland.

Honours
LDU Quito
Ecuadorian Serie A: 2018
Copa Ecuador: 2019
Supercopa Ecuador: 2020, 2021

Ecuador U–20
FIFA U-20 World Cup third place: 2019

References

External links

1999 births
Living people
Ecuador international footballers
Ecuador youth international footballers
Ecuadorian footballers
Association football midfielders
Charlotte FC players
C.S.D. Independiente del Valle footballers
Designated Players (MLS)
L.D.U. Quito footballers
People from Manta, Ecuador
Major League Soccer players
Ecuador under-20 international footballers